Guarapari Esporte Clube, commonly known as Guarapari, is a Brazilian football club based in Guarapari, Espírito Santo state. They competed in the Série B once.

History
The club was founded on June 12, 1936. They won the Campeonato Capixaba in 1987. They competed in the Série B in 1983, when they were eliminated in the First Stage of the competition.

Achievements
 Campeonato Capixaba:
 Winners (1): 1987

Stadium
Guarapari Esporte Clube play their home games at Estádio Davino Mattos. The stadium has a maximum capacity of 3,000 people.

References

Association football clubs established in 1936
Defunct football clubs in Espírito Santo
1936 establishments in Brazil